Jonathan Evison is a British Conservative politician who has been Humberside Police and Crime Commissioner since 2021.

Evison is a councillor for the Barton ward on North Lincolnshire Council and was elected Lord Mayor of the council on 20 May 2019. He served for two years due of the COVID-19 pandemic.

References

Living people
Police and crime commissioners in England
Councillors in the Borough of North Lincolnshire
Year of birth missing (living people)